The National Intelligence Organization is the state intelligence agency of Turkey.

National Intelligence Organization may also refer to:

 National Intelligence Organization (Papua New Guinea), the state intelligence agency of Papua New Guinea

See also 
 Intelligence Organization (series), a Turkish television series about the National Intelligence Organization